Callan is a town and civil parish in County Kilkenny in Ireland. Situated 16 km (10 mi) south of Kilkenny on the N76 road to Clonmel, it is near the border with County Tipperary. It is the second largest town in the county, and had a population of 2,475 at the 2016 census. Callan is the chief town of the barony of the same name.

History and name

Callan was founded by William the Marshal in 1207 and reputedly gets its name from the High King of Ireland, Niall Caille. It is reported that while at war with the Norsemen the High King arrived in Callan to find that its river was in flood. The King witnessed his servant trying to cross the river and being swept away by the fast-flowing current. 

The King, recorded in history as a man of action, seeing the impending disaster, impetuously urged his horse into the fast flowing river in a vain bid to save his servant, only to be also overcome and drowned by the torrent. The river in question is now named the "Kings River".

In order to commemorate those who died in the Callan area during World War One, a statue was erected outside the Church of the Assumption on Green Street.

In 2007, Callan celebrated its 800th year. President Mary McAleese launched the 800th celebrations of the town being granted a charter.

Places of interest
Callan Motte (also known locally as simply "The Moat") is located at the top of Moat Lane just off Bridge Street. It is one of Ireland's best-preserved Motte-and-bailey's.

Callan Augustinian Friary, known locally as the "Abbey Meadow", is at the North-East end of Callan and can also be accessed via Bridge Street.

St. Mary's Church is a medieval church located on Green Street. A historic workhouse is located in Prologue.

Education
Callan had two primary schools, Scoil Mhuire and Scoil Iognáid Rís. The two schools amalgamated in 2007 to form Bunscoil McAuley Rice.
Callan also has two secondary schools; the boys' school, Coláiste Éamann Rís, and the girls', St. Brigid's College.

Callan local electoral area
The Callan–Thomastown local electoral area of County Kilkenny includes the electoral divisions of Aghaviller, Ballyhale, Ballyvool, Bennettsbridge, Boolyglass, Bramblestown, Brownsford, Burnchurch, Callan Rural, Callan Urban, Castlebanny, Coolaghmore, Coolhill, Danesfort, Dunbell, Dunnamaggan, Dysartmoon, Earlstown, Ennisnag, Famma, Freaghana, Graiguenamanagh, Grange, Inistioge, Jerpoint Church, Kells, Kilfane, Killamery, Kilmaganny, Kiltorcan, Knocktopher, Mallardstown, Outrath, Pleberstown, Powerstown, Rosbercon Rural, Scotsborough, Stonyford, The Rower, Thomastown, Tullaghanbrogue, Tullaherin, Tullahought, Ullard and Woolengrange.

In popular culture
Neil Jordan's film Breakfast on Pluto with Cillian Murphy and Liam Neeson was filmed in Callan during August–September 2005. During the two weeks of filming in Callan, the main streets of the town were transformed for use in the film.

Callan was the set and stage for The Big Chapel X, a large-scale theatre production and community engagement project that drew on the history of the Callan schism, in August 2019, created by Asylum Productions in partnership with the Kilkenny Arts Festival supported by the Abbey Theatre and the Arts Council. Callan boasts many arts organisations including KCAT Arts Centre, Workhouse Union, Monkeyshine, Trasna Productions and Fennelly's Cafe.

People
Callan is the birthplace of a number of famous people, including:

 Edmund or Edward Butler (died  1584), a member of the Butler dynasty, Attorney General for Ireland   and a justice of the Court of King's Bench (Ireland), lived in Callan for most of his life.
 Gerald Comerford (died 1604), the principal landowner in Callan in the late sixteenth century and also an influential politician and judge; his tomb can still be seen at St Mary's Church
 Patrick Cudahy (1849–1919), American industrialist and philanthropist
 James Hoban who designed The White House and Leinster House among others was born in Desart, near Callan.
 Linda Hogan (born 1964), Professor of Ecumenics at Trinity College Dublin, and its former vice-provost
 Edmund Ignatius Rice, founder of the Irish Christian Brothers and the Presentation Brothers
 Thomas Kilroy Irish playwright and novelist. Author of the historical novel The Big Chapel.
 John Locke, Ireland's Poet in Exile, was born here in 1847.
 Seamus Moore (singer), Irish singer/songwriter
 Thomas Nash (Newfoundland) Irish fisherman, settled in Newfoundland and Labrador, Canada. Founder of Branch, Newfoundland and Labrador
 Tony O'Malley, Irish painter
 Amhlaoibh Ó Súilleabháin (1780–1838), was a schoolmaster and linen-draper in the town, and kept a diary in the Irish language between 1827 and 1835. This recorded in great detail the life of the town. Amhlaoibh's diary is considered one of the most detailed contemporary accounts of life in Ireland at the time.

See also
 List of abbeys and priories in Ireland (County Kilkenny)
 List of towns and villages in Ireland
 Market Houses in Ireland

References

Further reading
 
 
 
 
 
 
 
 
 
 
 
 
 
 

 
Towns and villages in County Kilkenny
Civil parishes of County Kilkenny
Census towns in County Kilkenny